Zomergem is a town and former municipality located in the Flanders and in the province of East Flanders, in Belgium. The municipality comprises the towns of Oostwinkel, Ronsele and Zomergem proper. On 1 January 2018, Zomergem had a total population of 	8,466. The total area is 38.78 km2.

Effective 1 January 2019, Waarschoot, Lovendegem and Zomergem were merged into the new municipality of Lievegem.

Gallery

References

External links

Official website 

Lievegem
Former municipalities of East Flanders
Populated places in East Flanders